Lead(II) carbonate is the chemical compound with the chemical formula . It is a white solid with several practical uses, despite its toxicity. It occurs naturally as the mineral cerussite.

Structure
Like all metal carbonates, lead(II) carbonate adopts a dense, highly crosslinked structure consisting of intact  and metal cation sites. As verified by X-ray crystallography, the Pb(II) centers are seven-coordinate, being surrounded by multiple carbonate ligands. The carbonate centers are bonded to bidentate to a single Pb and bridge to five other Pb sites.

Production and use
Lead carbonate is manufactured by passing carbon dioxide into a cold dilute solution of lead(II) acetate, or by shaking a suspension of a lead salt more soluble than the carbonate with ammonium carbonate at a low temperature to avoid formation of basic lead carbonate.

Lead carbonate is used as a catalyst to polymerize formaldehyde to poly(oxymethylene). It improves the bonding of chloroprene to wire.

Regulations
The supply and use of this compound is restricted in Europe.

Other lead carbonates
A number of lead carbonates are known:
 White lead, a basic lead carbonate, 
 Shannonite, 
 Plumbonacrite, 
 
 Abellaite, 
 Leadhillite,

References

External links
International Chemical Safety Card 0999

Lead(II) compounds
Carbonates